Durendal was a cultural and literary review published in Belgium from January 1894 to July 1914, when publication was interrupted by the First World War. A final commemorative issue appeared in 1921. It was founded by the politician Henry Carton de Wiart, the novelist Pol Demade, and the priest and literary critic Henry Moeller, who was to be the main editor.

Founded by progressive Catholics directly influenced by the Catholic literary revival in France, Durendal also published non-Catholic writers. Although free of any aesthetic partisanship, the review rapidly tended to Idealism and Symbolism, with Pre-Raphaelite and Wagnerian influences.

In 1899–1900, the review sponsored a "Salon of Religious Art".

Further reading
Françoise Chatelain, Une revue catholique au tournant du siècle: Durendal, 1894-1919 (Brussels, Académie Royale de Langue et de Littérature Françaises, 1983)

References

1894 establishments in Belgium
1921 disestablishments in Belgium
Catholic magazines
Defunct literary magazines published in Europe
Defunct magazines published in Belgium
French-language magazines
Magazines established in 1894
Magazines disestablished in 1921
Magazines published in Brussels
Monthly magazines published in Belgium
Visual arts magazines